Borran may refer to:
 Borran-e Olya, Iran
 Borran-e Sofla, Iran
 Buraan, Somalia